is a Japanese former actor and singer who is currently a fugitive. In 2013, he was reported to have taken ¥50 million (about US$ 450,000) from his fans between 2003 to 2012. Takasugi used the influence of his role as Kazuya Oki/Kamen Rider Super-1 to cheat his fans and refused to return the money. He said that this was because "Super-1's henshin belt was taken by the Yakuza and I need money to get it back." He refused to appear in court after he was sued and disappeared sometime in 2017.

Personal life
He is a research associate of a former Japan Ground Self-Defense Force ranger, from action to military guidance.

He is participating in "Treasures of the Shinkansenji" which is held annually as a series of events, talk shows and fan clubs.

During his career with Kamen Rider Super-1, his young age was reported in various media at the time, but in an interview he recently announced his actual age.

Filmography

Television

Films

Direct-to-video

Stage

Radio

Video games

Advertisements

Discography

Singles

Albums

See also
List of fugitives from justice who disappeared

References

External links
 

1949 births
Actors from Aichi Prefecture
Fugitives wanted by Japan
Japanese male singers
Japanese male voice actors
Japan Ground Self-Defense Force personnel
Living people